Todd Woodbridge and Mark Woodforde were the defending champions but only Woodbridge competed that year with Jonas Björkman.

Björkman and Woodbridge lost in the final 7–5, 7–6(7–3) against Jiří Novák and David Rikl.

Seeds
All sixteen seeded teams received byes into the second round.

Draw

Finals

Top half

Section 1

Section 2

Bottom half

Section 3

Section 4

External links
 2001 Ericsson Open Men's Doubles Draw

2001 Ericsson Open
Ericsson Open - Men's Doubles